Peter Smythe may refer to:

Peter Smythe, see Northern Football League (Australia)
Peter Smythe, see Candidates of the Victorian state election, 2010
Peter Smythe, character in Black Christmas (1974 film)

See also
Peter Smyth (disambiguation)
Peter Smith (disambiguation)